Tishchenko, Tischenko or Tyshchenko is a gender-neutral Ukrainian surname that may refer to

Aleksei Tishchenko (born 1984), Russian boxer 
Alisa Tishchenko (born 2004), Russian rhytmic gymnast
Anatoly Tishchenko (born 1970), Russian sprint canoer, brother of Olga 
Anatoly Tishchenko Sr. (born 1943), Russian sprint canoer, father of Anatoli and Olga
Andriy Tishchenko (born 1960), Ukrainian rower
Artem Tyshchenko (born 1993), Ukrainian biathlete
Boris Tishchenko (1939–2010), Russian composer and pianist
Diana Tishchenko (born 1990), Ukrainian classical violinist 
Elizaveta Tishchenko (born 1975), Russian volleyball player 
Evgeny Tishchenko (born 1991), Russian boxer 
Maksim Tishchenko (born 1974), Russian football coach and a former player
Nikolai Tishchenko (born 1926), Soviet football player
Oleksiy Tyshchenko (born 1994), Ukrainian football player
Olga Tishchenko (born 1973), Russian sprint canoer, sister of Anatoly
Stanislav Tishchenko (born 1974), Russian football player
Tatyana Tishchenko (born 1975), Russian sprint canoer
Vadym Tyshchenko (1963–2015), Ukrainian football player and coach
Vasili Tishchenko, Moldovan politician 
Viktor Tishchenko (born 1949), Russian football coach and a former player
Vyacheslav Tishchenko (1861–1941), Russian chemist known for
Tishchenko reaction 
Aldol–Tishchenko reaction 
Evans–Tishchenko reaction

See also
 
 

Ukrainian-language surnames